
Gmina Gać is a rural gmina (administrative district) in Przeworsk County, Subcarpathian Voivodeship, in south-eastern Poland.

Villages
Gmina Gać contains the villages and settlements of Białoboki, Dębów, Gać, Mikulice, Ostrów and Wolica.

Neighbouring gminas
Gmina Gać is bordered by the gminas of Kańczuga, Łańcut, Markowa and Przeworsk.

References

Polish official population figures 2006

Gac
Przeworsk County